Old Cooranga is a rural locality in the North Burnett Region, Queensland, Australia.

Geography 
The locality is bounded to the west by the Boyne River while the eastern boundary roughly follows the flow of Coocher Creek.

The east and south-east of the locality is within the Pile Gully State Forest which extends into neighbouring Pile Gully.

There is a small amount of irrigated horticulture in the west of the locality near the Boyne River.

History 
Cooranga Provisional School opened on Aug 1922 and closed in March 1923.

Education 
There are no schools in Old Cooranga. The nearest primary school is in Boynewood. The nearest secondary schools are in Mundubbera (to Year 10) and in Gayndah (to Year 12).

References 

North Burnett Region
Localities in Queensland